Lydia Bailey is an historical novel by the American writer Kenneth Roberts which was first published in 1947. It spent twelve weeks at the top of the list of The New York Times Fiction Best Sellers of 1947.

The book is set in the 19th century during the Haitian Revolution (1791-1804), with the action taking place in Haiti, France, and amongst the Barbary pirates. Albion Hamlin, a young American develops an obsession for Lydia Bailey, a woman he has never set eyes on.

Film adaptation

In 1952 the novel was adapted into a Technicolor film by the Hollywood Studio 20th Century Fox. It was directed by Jean Negulesco, from a screenplay by Michael Blankfort and Philip Dunne. The filmmakers expanded the title role far beyond her more marginal position in the novel, and slimmed down the narrative while setting it entirely on Haiti. A number of actresses were linked with the role of Bailey, including Micheline Presle, Jean Simmons, Linda Darnell, and Susan Hayward, before it was given to Anne Francis.

References

External links
 

1947 American novels
American novels adapted into films
Doubleday (publisher) books
Historical novels
Novels by Kenneth Roberts
Novels set in Haiti
Novels set in France
Novels set in the 19th century
Novels set in the Haitian Revolution